Duffie or Duffié is a surname. Notable people with the surname include:

Alfred N. Duffié (1833–1880), French-American soldier and diplomat who served in the Crimean War and the American Civil War
Darrell Duffie (born 1954), Canadian economist
Grace Duffie Boylan (1861–1935), American writer
John Duffie (born 1945), former pitcher in Major League Baseball
Kieran Duffie (born 1992), professional Football player
Matt Duffie (born 1990), professional rugby league player
Paul Duffie (born 1951), former politician, lawyer and judge in the Canadian province of New Brunswick
William R. Duffie (1931–1999), forestry engineer and political figure in New Brunswick, Canada

See also
Duffy